Sophia L. Witherspoon (born July 6, 1969) is a former American college and professional basketball player who was a guard for seven seasons in the Women's National Basketball Association (WNBA).  Witherspoon played college basketball for the University of Florida, and was selected in the second round of the 1997 WNBA Draft.  She played professionally for the New York Liberty, Portland Fire and Los Angeles Sparks of the WNBA.

Early years 

Witherspoon was born in Fort Pierce, Florida.  Her older brother introduced her to basketball when she was 6 years old.  She attended Fort Pierce Central High School, where she was a standout high school basketball player for the Fort Pierce Central Cobras.

College career 

Witherspoon accepted an athletic scholarship to attend the University of Florida in Gainesville, Florida, where she played for coach Carol Ross's Florida Gators women's basketball team from 1988 to 1991.  In three seasons as a Gator, she scored 1,381 points, made 445 rebounds, and was a first-team All-Southeastern Conference (SEC) selection in 1991.  She graduated from the University of Florida with a bachelor's degree in health and human performance in 1991, and was inducted into the University of Florida Athletic Hall of Fame as a "Gator Great" in 2005.  In her honor, the Florida Office of Student Life awards the Sophia Witherspoon Award for Overall Excellence each semester to two Gator athletes "who exemplify the positive attitude and strong work ethic in the classroom that they display on the playing field."

Florida statistics
Source

USA Basketball

Witherspoon was named to the USA team for the 1993 World University Games competition in Buffalo, New York.  The team had a 6–2 record and won the bronze medal. Witherspoon averaged 1.8 points per game.

Professional career 

The New York Liberty selected Witherspoon in the second round (seventh pick overall) of the 1997 WNBA Draft.  She played for the Liberty from 1997 to 2000, the Portland Fire from 2000 to 2001, and the Los Angeles Sparks from 2001 to 2003.

See also 

 List of Florida Gators in the WNBA
 List of University of Florida alumni
 List of University of Florida Athletic Hall of Fame members

References

External links 
  Sophia Witherspoon – Official WNBA player profile

1969 births
Living people
American women's basketball players
American expatriate basketball people in Hungary
American expatriate basketball people in Italy
American expatriate basketball people in Turkey
Basketball players from Florida
Florida Gators women's basketball players
Galatasaray S.K. (women's basketball) players
Los Angeles Sparks players
New York Liberty draft picks
New York Liberty players
Portland Fire players
Universiade bronze medalists for the United States
Universiade medalists in basketball
Guards (basketball)
Medalists at the 1993 Summer Universiade